Asha is the Zoroastrian concept of "truth, order".

Asha or ASHA may also refer to:

Places 
 Asha, Cyprus, a village in Famagusta District, Cyprus
 Asha, Russia, a town in Chelyabinsk Oblast, Russia

People 
 Asha Bhosle (born 1933), Indian playback singer, for films
 Asha Posley (1927 – 1998), Pakistani actress and singer in Hindi, Urdu and Punjabi films
 Asha Jaquilla Degree (born 1990), an American child who went missing in 2000
 Asha Kreimer (born 1989), Australian woman who has been missing since 2015
 Asha Parekh (born 1942), Indian Hindi film actress of the 1960s-1970s
 Asha Puthli, India-born jazz singer
 Aṣa (pronounced "Àshá"), a Nigerian-French singer-songwriter

Arts, entertainment, and media 
 Asha (1980 film)
 Asha Greyjoy, a character in George R. R. Martin's A Song of Ice and Fire novels
 Asha, Todd Anderson's employee and love interest in the film Outsourced (2006)
 Brimful of Asha, a 1997 song by Cornershop
 DS Asha Israni, DI Jimmy Perez's love interest and colleague in the TV series Shetland, series 3

Organizations 
 American School Health Association
 American Schools and Hospitals Abroad, a USAID program
 American Seniors Housing Association
 American Sexual Health Association
 Accredited Social Health Activist, community health workers in India
 American Speech–Language–Hearing Association
 American Student Health Association, original name for the American College Health Association
 Asha for Education

Technology 
 Audio Streaming for Hearing Aids (ASHA), an open streaming media protocol for audio casting to hearing receivers.

Other uses 
 Nokia Asha series, smartphones using the Series 40 operating system
 Asha - African American Collection, a short lived doll line from Mattel; see

See also 
 Aasha (disambiguation)
 Ascha, a municipality in Straubing-Bogen, Bavaria, Germany
 Arsha (disambiguation)